

Telephones 
Country calling code: 687

Telephones - main lines in use:
53,300 (2004) (up from 44,000 in 1995)

Telephones - mobile cellular:
116,400 (2004) (up from 825 in 1995)

Telephone system:
domestic:
NA
international:
satellite earth station - 1 Intelsat (Pacific Ocean)

Radio and television 
Radio broadcast stations:
AM 1, FM 5, Digital Radio Oceane, shortwave 0 (2009)

Radios:
107,000 (1997)

Television broadcast stations:
6 (plus 25 low-power repeaters) (1997)

Televisions:
52,000 (1997)

Internet 
Internet Service Providers (ISPs):
1 (1999)

Country code (Top level domain): NC

See also 
 Telephone numbers in New Caledonia

References 

Communications in New Caledonia
+New Caledonia